Licze  is a village in the administrative district of Gmina Kwidzyn, within Kwidzyn County, Pomeranian Voivodeship, in northern Poland.

During World War II, the German Stalag XX-B prisoner-of-war camp was located in the village for several weeks in December 1939–January 1940, before it was relocated to Wielbark near Malbork.

The village has a population of 522.

References

Licze